The Fidelity Building is a 15-story,   high rise building in the  central business district of Baltimore, Maryland. Completed in 1894,  it was later the headquarters of the Fidelity and Deposit Company of Baltimore which was founded in 1892.

Overview
Located at the rise of Cathedral Hill at the northwest corner of North Charles Street and West Lexington Street on the eastern edge of the city's main live and movie theatre district along West Lexington and the department store/retail shopping area focused several blocks west at Howard and Lexington Streets. It also is situated at the south end of the tony Victorian-era residential townhouses and mansions of the neighborhood of Mount Vernon-Belvedere, centered by the landmark Washington Monument several blocks north, visible from the F. & D.'s front doors. The building's architectural style is Romanesque Revival. The building designed by the prominent local architectural firm of Baldwin & Pennington, composed of leading regional designers, Ephraim Francis Baldwin, (1837–1916) and Josias Pennington, (1854–1929) - main "house architects" for stations and structures of the dominant Baltimore and Ohio Railroad. B. & P. used steel cage framing construction with a grey, rough-cut granite facing. The original roof had French dormers and mansard roof (evoking French Second Empire styling  and a southeast corner cupola/tower.

The building is used for business by Fidelity. The building originally contained eight floors with a façade of grey granite, with a corner cupola tower and mansard roof. It stood on the northwestern edge of the famous "burnt district" of the February 1904 Great Baltimore Fire which destroyed numerous downtown and waterfront buildings and skyscrapers up to across the street. Following the initial reconstruction phase of 1905–1910, when several recently built downtown towers were burned out, but their steel skeletons and concrete foundations/floors and floors survived structurally sound and were rebuilt with new interiors and masonry facades. So F. & D. under the leadership of founder and president Edwin Warfield, (1848–1920), former 45th governor of Maryland, made arrangements between 1912 and 1915, reflecting the continued growth of the company to add seven more floors were added to the top of the building, increasing the number of floors to fifteen, with the upper storied covered with a surface of terra-cotta, matching the style of the original architecture below.

In 1962, One Charles Center was constructed next to the Fidelity Building.

See also
List of tallest buildings in Baltimore

References

Downtown Baltimore
Office buildings completed in 1893
Skyscraper office buildings in Baltimore